Madonna of the Desert is a 1948 American crime film directed by George Blair and written by Albert DeMond. The film stars Lynne Roberts, Don "Red" Barry, Don Castle, Sheldon Leonard, Paul Hurst and Roy Barcroft. The film was released on February 23, 1948 by Republic Pictures.

Plot

Cast   
Lynne Roberts as Monica Dale
Don "Red" Barry as Tony French 
Don Castle as Joe Salinas
Sheldon Leonard as Nick Julian
Paul Hurst as Pete Connors
Roy Barcroft as Buck Keaton
Paul E. Burns as Hank Davenport
Betty Blythe as Mrs. Brown
Grazia Narciso as Mama Baravelli
Martin Garralaga as Papa Baravelli
Frank Yaconelli as Peppo
Maria Genardi as Mrs. Pasquale
Renee Donatt as Maria Baravelli
Vernon Cansino as Enrico

References

External links 
 

1948 films
American crime films
1948 crime films
Republic Pictures films
Films directed by George Blair
American black-and-white films
1940s English-language films
1940s American films
English-language crime films